The Triple Truck Challenge is a series of races in the NASCAR Craftsman Truck Series that is designed to give attention to series regulars. The program debuted in 2019.

History
On February 4, 2019, NASCAR announced the formation of the Triple Truck Challenge. The Challenge consisted of three consecutive races, held at Texas Motor Speedway, Iowa Speedway and Gateway Motorsports Park. Only drivers eligible for Truck Series points could be on the entry lists for those races. If a driver won one of the three races, a $50,000 prize was awarded; if a driver won two of the three races, a $200,000 prize was awarded; and if a driver won all three races, a $500,000 prize was awarded. Greg Biffle won the first race of the challenge, driving for Kyle Busch Motorsports in a one-off entry, and was not eligible to win the bonus money for the next race at Iowa due to not being listed on the preliminary entry form.

For 2020, the Challenge races were planned to be to Richmond Raceway, Dover International Speedway and Charlotte Motor Speedway, again holding consecutive slots in the schedule. The requirement for a driver to be on the preliminary entry list to be eligible for the prize money was also dropped. Due to the COVID-19 pandemic, the 2020 races were changed to the Daytona International Speedway road course, a rescheduled Dover date and World Wide Technology Raceway at Gateway.

Darlington Raceway and Circuit of the Americas were introduced for the 2021 Challenge, while Charlotte returned as the third race.

Results

See also 
Dash 4 Cash

References 

NASCAR trophies and awards
NASCAR Truck Series